Shahgodar or Shah Godar may refer to:
 Shah Godar, Kermanshah
 Shahgodar-e Mohammad, Kermanshah Province
 Shahgodar-e Zamkan, Kermanshah Province
 Shah Godar-e Sofla, Kurdistan Province